The 1905–06 season was Manchester United's 14th season in the Football League. United finished second in the Second Division and gained promotion to the Football League First Division for the 1906–07 season. In the FA Cup, United reached the fourth round, where they were defeated by Woolwich Arsenal.

Second Division

FA Cup
Manchester United entered the 1905–06 FA Cup at the First Round Proper stage and were drawn at home to Staple Hill on 13 January 1906. United dominated the match, winning 7–2 with a hat-trick from Clem Beddow and two goals from Jack Picken; Jack Allan and Harry Williams scored the other two goals. In the Second Round, United were drawn at home to Norwich City on 3 February 1906. Harry Moger kept the Canaries off the score sheet, while United saw goals from Alex Downie, Jack Peddie and Charlie Sagar. The Reds then faced Aston Villa at home in the Third Round stage on 24 February. 35,500 fans watched United defeat Villa 5–1 to reach the Fourth Round for the first time in their history; Picken scored a hat-trick for United, while Sagar scored two goals. United were drawn at home to Woolwich Arsenal in the Fourth Round. The match was played on 10 March, but goals by Peddie and Sagar would not be enough, as Arsenal advanced the next round with three goals of their own.

Squad statistics

References

Manchester United F.C. seasons
Manchester United